Nowlur is a neighbourhood and a part of Urban Notified Area of Amaravati, the state capital of the Indian state of Andhra Pradesh. It was an out growth of Mangalagiri Municipality in Guntur district, prior to its merger in the urban area of the state capital.

Geography 

Demographics 

 census, Nowlur had a population of 24,861. The total population constitute, 12,431 males and 12,430 females —a sex ratio of 999 females per 1000 males. 2,598 children are in the age group of 0–6 years, of which 1,321 are boys and 1,277 are girls. The average literacy rate stands at 68.19% with 15,180 literates, significantly higher than the state average of 67.41%.

Transport 

 is the nearest railway station to the out growth.

References

Neighbourhoods in Amaravati